Brick Church may refer to:

Brick Church (NJT station), a New Jersey Transit station in East Orange along the Morris and Essex Line
Brick Church Complex (New Hempstead, New York), historic Dutch Reformed church
Brick Presbyterian Church (Perry, New York)
Brick Presbyterian Church Complex (Rochester, New York)
Brick Presbyterian Church (New York City)

See also
Brick Church Corners, also known as Ontario Heritage Square, a national historic district located at Ontario, New York
Red Brick Church (Sodus Center, New York), historic Baptist church
Little Brick Church (Cedar Grove, West Virginia), also known as Virginia's Church, built 1853
Old Brick Church (disambiguation)
Brick Presbyterian Church (disambiguation)